During its history as independent entity, Mantua had different rulers who governed on the city and the lands of Mantua from the Middle Ages to the early modern period.

From 970 to 1115, the Counts of Mantua were members of the House of Canossa. During its time as free commune and signoria ("lordship"), the Lords of Mantua were exponents of the Bonacolsi and Gonzaga families. From 1328, Mantua was informally led by Gonzagas until 1433, when Gianfrancesco Gonzaga assumed the noble title of Marquess of Mantua. In 1530, Federico II received the title of Duke of Mantua. In 1531, the family acquired the vacant Marquisate of Montferrat through marriage.

In 1627, Duke Vincent II deceased without heirs, ending the original line of Gonzagas. From 1628 to 1631, a succession war was fought between the Duke of Guastalla, supported by the Holy Roman Empire, and the Duke of Nevers, supported by France, for the control of the Duchy of Mantua. Finally, the Duke of Nevers was recognized as only Duke.

In 1708, Mantua was seized by the Habsburgs, ending Gonzaga rule. Montferrat's territories were ceded to the Duke of Savoy. The emperor compensated the Duke of Lorraine, heir in the female line of the Gonzaga, for the loss of Montferrat by ceding the Duchy of Teschen to the Lorraine. In 1745, Mantua was formally unified with the Duchy of Milan, until its dissolution in 1796.

Counts of Mantua (970–1115)

House of Canossa

Lords of Mantua (1272–1433)

Marquesses of Mantua (1433–1530)

House of Gonzaga

Dukes of Mantua (1530–1708)

House of Gonzaga

House of Gonzaga-Nevers

References

External links
"A complete genealogical tree of the House of Gonzaga"
"The House of Gonzaga, heirs to the sovereign marquessate of Mantua"
I Gonzaga di Mantova

 
Mantua
1328 establishments in Europe
1708 disestablishments in Italy
Duchy of Mantua
Mantua